New Concorde (NC) is an American Los Angeles, California based film distribution company founded by Roger Corman. NC got its start in 1983 when Corman formed the production and distribution Concorde-New Horizons (CNH) as one of the first production companies to develop and take advantage of video as a distribution tool.

History
The company was originally Concorde-New Horizons, which was itself created when Corman combined his two new companies Concorde Pictures (CP) and New Horizons Pictures in 1983. The company is now officially known as New Horizons Picture Corp.

Beginnings
Corman founded New World Productions (NWP) in 1970, and had been making low budget genre films until 1982.  When larger studios began producing the same genres with larger budgets that his company could not meet, and after being approached by a consortium of attorneys wishing to buy the company, he opted in 1982 to sell his interests.  However, when he left NWP, he retained all rights to his large back catalogue of films and took most members of his creative team with him. He wished to continue producing films but without the tedious negotiations required for distribution, and so in 1983 he formed Concorde Pictures and then New Horizons pictures as companies to produce films that New World was to distribute.  He met with various contractual and legal problems when dealing with New World, causing his plans with them to fall through. He then combined the two firms to create Concorde-New Horizon, and began talks with independent producers in the hopes of setting up a distribution arm for CNH. Those talks were not successful, and this left Corman distributing his own films.

Growth
This proved fortunate for Corman, as CNH came into existence during the beginnings of the home video boom. He found he was in an ideal position to capitalize on the new market.  Using his extensive back catalogue and his creative team he was able to take full advantage of the new and growing video market and created films specifically targeted toward home video. This made Concorde-New Horizons one of the first production companies to fully develop and capitalize on video as a distribution tool.  This allowed Corman's Concorde-New Horizons to be more prolific than his former New World Productions, but that productivity resulted in a lowering of standards. The new New World films were themselves seen as producers of low quality products, but their films were seen as having an energy and charm that Corman's films seemed to lack. However, his goal to create films for a direct-to-video market has been financially successful.

In early 2000 Corman renamed the firm 'New Concorde', sold the New Horizons Pictures (NHP) branch, and reorganized to form New Concorde Home Entertainment.

In 2005 Concorde signed a 12-year deal with Buena Vista Home Entertainment giving BVHE distribution rights to the more than 400 Roger Corman produced films. Buena Vista ended the deal with New Horizons early in 2008, largely due to poor sales and poor masters for many of the titles.

In 2010, Shout! Factory signed a large package deal with New Horizons Pictures for nearly all the Concorde-New Horizon and pre-1984 New World Pictures catalog, including those that were previously put out by Buena Vista Home Entertainment. In March 2018, Shout! Factory acquired New Horizons from Roger Corman, giving them complete ownership of all the Concorde-New Horizon and pre-1984 New World Pictures libraries. Shout! Factory controls distribution rights in North America, Europe, Australia, and Russia, while Chinese company Ace Film HK Company signed distribution deals with Shout for China, most of Asia, Africa, and South America. Soon after the contract, Roger Corman and his wife, Julie Corman were sued by their sons, Roger and Brian, for ownership of the film library.

Production and distribution

Concorde-New Horizons has produced over 122 films, including Bloodfist, Shadow Dancer, The Sea Wolf, Munchie Strikes Back, and Summer Camp Nightmare, and has distributed over 39 films, including Supergator, Slaughter Studios, Dragon Fire, and Eye of the Eagle. The New Concorde Home Entertainment concentrates on distribution, and has released over 90 films, including Dinocroc, Avalanche Alley, Humanoids from the Deep, Munchies, and The Slumber Party Massacre. Concorde Pictures, has produced 9 films, including Killer Instinct, Watchers II, Time Trackers, and The Drifter, and has distributed over 144 films, including Avalanche Alley, The Sea Wolf, Humanoids from the Deep, Star Hunter, and Wizards of the Lost Kingdom.

Partial filmography

Production

Cry of the Winged Serpent (2006) (TV)
Dinocroc (2004)
Ice Crawkers (2003)
Barbarian (2003) (V)
Slaughter Studios (2002)
Raptor (2001)
The Arena (2001/I)
Kyoko (2000)
Nightfall (2000)
Moving Target (2000)
The Prophet (1999)
Detonator (1998)
Future Fear (1998)
Inferno (1997)
Black Scorpion II: Aftershock (1997)
Eruption (1997)
Overdrive (1997)
Shadow Dancer (1997)
The Sea Wolf (1997)
Carnosaur 3: Primal Species (1996)
Vampirella (1996)
Humanoids from the Deep (1996) (TV)
One Night Stand (1995)
Bloodfist VII: Manhunt (1995)
A Bucket of Blood (1995) (TV)
Black Scorpion (1995) (TV)
Sawbones (1995) (TV)
Stripteaser (1995)
Suspect Device (1995)
Carnosaur 2 (1995)
Hellfire (1995) (TV)
Baby Face Nelson (1995)
Not of This Earth (1995)
Star Hunter (1995)
The Wasp Woman (1995) (TV)
White Wolves II: Legend of the Wild (1995)
Stranglehold (1994)
Watchers III (1994)
One Man Army (1994)

Munchie Strikes Back (1994)
Saturday Night Special (1994)
The Crazysitter (1994)
Angel of Destruction (1994)
Fire on the Amazon (1993)
Eight Hundred Leagues Down the Amazon (1993)
Firehawk (1993)
Dragon Fire (1993)
Kill Zone (1993)
Little Miss Millions (1993)
Munchie (1992)
Final Judgement (1992)
The Unborn (1991)
Field of Fire (1991)
Uncaged (1991)
Killer Instinct (1991)
The Haunting of Morella (1990)
Watchers II (1990)
A Cry in the Wild (1990)
Ultra Warrior (1990)
Play Murder for Me (1990)
Bloodfist II (1990) (with Concord Production Inc.)
Masque of the Red Death (1989)
Nowhere to Run (1989)
Time Trackers (1989)
Crime Zone (1989)
The Drifter (1988)
Two to Tango (1988)
Watchers (1988)
Deathstalker and the Warriors from Hell (1988)
The New Gladiators (1988)
Summer Camp Nightmare (1987)
Iris (1987)
Stripped to Kill (1987)
Sweet Revenge (1987)
Eye of the Eagle (1987)
Sorority House Massacre (1986)
Recruits (1986) .
Last Resort (1986)
Chopping Mall (1986)

Distribution

The Interrogation of Muscular POW (2014; cancelled)
Dinocroc vs. Supergator (2010)
Supergator (2007)
Dinocroc (2004)
The Erotic Misadventures of the Invisible Man (2003)
Flyin' Ryan (2003)
Book of Days (2003)
Barbarian (2003)
Firefight (2003)
Flyin' Ryan (2003)
Slaughter Studios (2002)
Shakedown (2002)
Hope Ranch (2002) (TV)
Mary Christmas (2002) (TV)
Escape from Afghanistan (2002)
Second to Die (2002)
Disappearance (2002) (TV)
Love Thy Neighbor (2002/I)
Raptor (2001)
Avalanche Alley (2001) (TV)
A Girl, Three Guys, and a Gun (2001)
The Arena (2001/I)
Nightfall (2000)
Take It to the Limit (2000)
The Suicide Club (2000)
Dangerous Curves (2000)
Love 101 (2000)
White Wolves III: Cry of the White Wolf (2000)
Watchers Reborn (1998)
The Protector (1998/II)
The Prophet (1999)
Black Thunder (1998/II)
The Sea Wolf (1997)
Black Scorpion II: Aftershock (1997)
Shadow Dancer (1997)
Vampirella (1996) (V)
Humanoids from the Deep (1996) (TV)
House of the Damned (1996)
Bloodfist VIII: Trained to Kill (1996)
Ladykiller (1996)
Shadow Warriors (1996)
Humanoids from the Deep (1996) (TV)
Bloodfist VIII: Trained to Kill (1996)
Bloodfist VII: Manhunt (1995)
Bloodfist VI: Ground Zero (1995)
When the Bullet Hits the Bone (1995)
Black Scorpion (1995) (TV)
Hellfire (1995) (TV)
Not of This Earth (1995)
Star Hunter (1995)
The Wasp Woman (1995) (TV)
Piranha (1995) (TV)
Carnosaur 2 (1995)
Munchie (1992)
Munchie Strikes Back (1994)
Saturday Night Special (1994)
Terminal Voyage (1994)
The Unborn II (1994)
Bloodfist V: Human Target (1994)
Little Miss Millions (1993)

Dragon Fire (1993)
Stepmonster (1993)
Voor een verloren soldaat (1992)
Bloodfist III: Forced to Fight (1992)
Dance with Death (1991)
Killer Instinct (1991)
Corporate Affairs (1990)
Watchers II (1990)
A Cry in the Wild (1990)
Full Fathom Five (1990)
Slumber Party Massacre III (1990)
A Cry in the Wild (1990)
 (1990)
Ultra Warrior (1990)
Brain Dead (1990)
Bloodfist II (1990)
Bloodfist (1989)
Flesh Gordon Meets the Cosmic Cheerleaders (1989)
Think Big (1989)
Transylvania Twist (1989)
Bloodfist (1989)
Food of the Gods II (1989)
The Terror Within (1989)
Barbarian Queen II: The Empress Strikes Back (1989)
Lords of the Deep (1989)
Nowhere to Run (1989)
Time Trackers (1989) 
Purple People Eater (1988)
Saturday the 14th Strikes Back (1988)
The Drifter (1988)
Not of This Earth (1988)
Nightfall (1988)
Deathstalker and the Warriors from Hell (1988)
Slumber Party Massacre II (1987)
Munchies (1987)
Summer Camp Nightmare (1987)
Sweet Revenge (1987)
Deathstalker II (1987)
Eye of the Eagle (1987)
Hunter's Blood (1986)
Last Resort (1986)
Sorority House Massacre (1986)
Amazons (1986)
Chopping Mall (1986)
Hollywood Vice Squad (1986)
The Dirt Bike Kid (1985)
Wizards of the Lost Kingdom (1985)
Cocaine Wars (1985)
Loose Screws (1985)
Wheels of Fire (1985)
The Devastator (1985)
Barbarian Queen (1985)
School Spirit (1985)
The Warrior and the Sorceress (1984)
Ciske de Rat (1984)
Emmanuelle IV (1984)
The Slumber Party Massacre (1982)

References

External links

Mass media companies established in 1983
Film distributors of the United States
Companies based in Los Angeles